In linguistics, a libfix is a productive bound morpheme affix created by rebracketing and back-formation, often a generalization of a component of a blended or portmanteau word. For example, walkathon was coined in 1932 as a blend of walk and marathon, and soon thereafter the -athon part was reinterpreted as a libfix morpheme meaning "event or activity lasting a long time or involving a great deal of something". Words formed with this suffix include talkathon, telethon, hackathon, and so on. Affixes whose morpheme boundaries are etymologically based, and which are used in their original sense, are not libfixes. Libfixes often utilise interthesis, as in the example of -holism and -holic which are joined with consonant-final segments via the vowel /a/, creating work-a-holism or sex-a-holism.

History

Splinters were defined by Berman in 1961 as non-morphemic word fragments. This includes not just libfixes, but also word fragments which become words, like burger (< hamburger), flu (< influenza), and net (< network).

The name libfix was coined by Arnold Zwicky in 2010 as a blend of "liberated" and "affix" specifically for splinters used as productive morphemes.

Criticism

Some of these formations have been considered barbarisms by prescriptive writers on style, though other writers have praised them. Speaking of the -tron suffix, a philologist commented:
I once heard an unkind critic allude disparagingly to these neologisms as dog-Greek. To a lover of the language of Sophocles and Plato these recent coinages may indeed appear to be Greek debased. More appropriately, perhaps, they might be termed lion-Greek or chameleon-Greek. They are Neo-Hellenic in the genuine Renaissance tradition.

Examples

Each example gives the affix, the source word(s) from which it was formed, the meaning, and examples.

This list does not include:
 affixes based on English words like tech or burger used literally, even if they are shortened forms, in this case, for technology and hamburger;
 affixes which are aligned in form and meaning with their etymological source, like -(o)cracy or -orama in cyclorama and diorama from  'spectacle'; motorama is a portmanteau of motor and orama, not a compound of mot- and -orama;
 words which have been separated from phrases, e.g. fu from kung fu.

English

Suffixes
 -ana 
things related to a given person, place, period
 Churchilliana, Americana, Victoriana
 -ase 
an enzyme
lactase, polymerase
 -cation 
kinds of vacation
staycation, girlcation
 -copter 
having a spinning rotor allowing for flight
gyrocopter
 -core 
 aesthetic
speedcore, grindcore, cottagecore, bardcore
 -dar 
the skill of detecting qualities or things
 gaydar, humordar, Jewdar
 -erati 
groups of people with common interests
digerati, glitterati
 -gate 
a scandal
gamergate, troopergate; see List of "-gate" scandals
 -(a)holic, -(a)holism  
addict(ed)
shopaholic, workaholic, sexaholic; see English terms suffixed with -holic
 -(m)(a)geddon 
major disasters (usually facetious)
snowgeddon, carmageddon
 -kini 
type of bathing suit
burkini, monokini, tankini
 -(i/e/a/∅)licious 
a high degree of some property (usually jocular)
bootylicious, babelicious, yummalicious, sacrilicious, crunchalicious
 -(o)nomics 
an economic policy or philosophy
Reaganomics, freakonomics
 -ola  
used to form commercial products; later, for forms of bribery
Victrola, moviola, shinola; payola, plugola
 -oma 
a kind of tumor, swelling, or cancer
melanoma, adenoma, papilloma
 -ome, -omics 
 a map of a biological system; and other uses in biology
 connectome, proteome; biome, rhizome, vacuome
 -on 
an elementary particle or quasiparticle
proton, neutron, meson, phonon, etc.; see List of particles
 -(o)rama, -o-rama 
a spectacle or event, also an augmentative
Cinerama, Bananarama, Foodarama
 -preneur 
an entrepreneur in some domain
 intrapreneur, ecopreneur, mompreneur
 -tard 
people who are foolish or stupid; pejorative
fucktard, libtard
 -(a)thon, -a-thon 
things that last a long time or require remarkable endurance
walkathon, telethon, hackathon
 -tron 
a kind of vacuum tube; a subatomic particle; a device
 magnetron; positron; cyclotron
 -verse 
 the collection of all things in a category, or a fictional universe
 blogoverse, Twitterverse, Whoniverse
 -wich 
sandwich
fishwich, hamwich, snackwich
 -zilla 
monstrous, scary, or large things; can function as an augmentative and pejorative
bridezilla, Mozilla

Prefixes
 alt- 
outside the mainstream
alt-rock, alt-right
 cyber- 
issues or policies related to computers
cyberspace, cybercrime
 eco- 
related to the environment, to ecology, or to sustainability
eco-terrorism, eco-nationalism, eco-investing
 econo- 
related to economics; economical, inexpensive
econometrics (not *economometrics), econophysics; econobox
 franken- 
related to “human efforts to interfere with nature”
 frankenfood, frankenplant, frankenscience
 glut- {{nobold|< gluten, glutamic acid}}
related to the amino acid, glutamic acidglutamine, glutamate heli- 
types of helicopters; things related to helicopters
 helibus; helipad, heliport, helidrome, heliborne petro- 
things related to petroleumpetrodollar, petrochemical, petrocurrency syn- 
synthetic; related to (musical) synthesizers
 syngas, synfuel, syncrude, SynclavierItalian
Suffix
 -opoli 
a scandalBancopoli, CalciopoliBibliography

 Bernard Fradin, "Combining forms, blends, and related phenomena", in Ursula Doleschal, Anna M. Thornton, eds., Extragrammatical and Marginal Morphology, LINCOM studies in theoretical linguistics 12 (2000), papers from a workshop in Vienna, 1996, p. 11-59 full text
 Otto Jespersen, Language Its Nature, Development, and Origin, 1922, 19:13-15
 Muriel Norde, Sara Sippach, "Nerdalicious scientainment: A network analysis of English libfixes", Word Structure 12:3:353-384 .
 Yuval Pinter, Cassandra L. Jacobs, Max Bittker. "NYTWIT: A Dataset of Novel Words in the New York Times", Proceedings of the 28th International Conference on Computational Linguistics (Barcelona), p. 6509–6515, December 8–13, 2020. full text
 Neal Whitman, "A linguistic tour of the best libfixes, from -ana to -zilla, The Week, September 17, 2013.
 Arnold Zwicky, "Playing with your Morphology", Language Log'', August 28, 2006

Notes

Word coinage
Affixes